Angel Mary Joseph (born 24 September 1953) is a retired Indian track and field athlete. She specialized in 100 metres hurdles, Long Jump, Pentathlon, and once held national records in all the three and high jump and heptathlon. At the 1978 Asian Games in Bangkok, she won silver medals in long jump and pentathlon. She also represented Karnataka and Railways playing basketball in the National Championships.

Recognizing her achievements in track and field, Mary was awarded the Arjuna Award by the government of India in 1979.

References

External links
 

1953 births
People from Davanagere
Living people
Sportswomen from Karnataka
Athletes (track and field) at the 1974 Asian Games
Athletes (track and field) at the 1978 Asian Games
Athletes (track and field) at the 1982 Asian Games
Indian female long jumpers
20th-century Indian women
20th-century Indian people
Indian female sprinters
Indian pentathletes
Asian Games silver medalists for India
Medalists at the 1978 Asian Games
Asian Games medalists in athletics (track and field)
Athletes from Karnataka
Recipients of the Arjuna Award